Berrichon ( or ) is an Oïl language very closely related to French or a dialect of it traditionally spoken in the historical area of the French province of Berry. The word is also used as a demonym and as an adjective meaning "pertaining to Berry".

History
The dialect evolved out of the langues d'oïl which evolved during the Middle Ages out of the Vulgar Latin spoken in northern Gaul. Its general use in the Berry region began to decline in the sixteenth century as the local aristocracy and bourgeoisie began to adopt standard French, leaving Berrichon as a "patois" used by the peasantry in the countryside. Subsequent developments, such as the French Revolution, which created a sense of nationalism, and the establishment of free, mandatory, primary education under the Minister of Public Instruction, Jules Ferry, which greatly expanded the teaching of French, further undermined the position of Berrichon.

Current status
The decline of Berrichon has virtually led to it being regarded as a sub-standard dialect of French rather than a separate language. Additionally, as most speakers in its region now speak standard French, it is no longer possible to say that a Berrichon "patois" exists, but rather that a regional version of French does. Nevertheless, traces of Berrichon and its regional varieties remain today. This is exemplified in the continued use of Berrichon terms in spoken French among speakers in the region.

Phonology and lexicon
Although Berrichon does not have an official grammar or pronunciation, there are general rules as to how it differs from French. Berrichon differentiates between closed and open a. Rs are rolled and emphatic. Words which have the o sound in standard French are pronounced with a close back rounded vowel, resulting in, for example, un houmme (man), une poumme (apple). The oi [wa] sound becomes oé [oe].  The suffix -eur becomes -eux in Berrichon, and -eau becomes -iau; therefore, leurs (theirs) is ieux and un seau d'eau (a bucket of water) is un siau d'iau.

Conjugation is also different. The present indicative of the first-person singular, the third-person singular and the third-person plural are all conjugated in the same manner, which results in phrases of the type, "j'menons les oies" ("I lead the geese"). There is also frequent truncation: "i m'nons les oies" ("they lead the geese"). Tense endings are also different from standard French, as in the third person plural imperfect ending -aient is replaced by -aint, e.g., "i's étaint" instead of "ils étaient" ("They used to be").

In Berry, it is customary to precede given names with articles: la for women's names and eul for men's names.

When referring to weather terms, the pronoun ça is used in place of the French il. For example, "Il pleut" (It is raining.) would be  "Ça pleut" in Berrichon.

Examples of Berrichon vocabulary being used instead of their French counterparts include:

See also
Languages of France
Langues d'oïl

References

Languages of France
French dialects
Oïl languages
Demonyms